Lynyrd Skynyrd 1991 is the sixth studio album by American Southern rock band Lynyrd Skynyrd. It was the band's first new studio album since 1977's Street Survivors and the first following a 1977 plane crash that claimed the lives of three members of the band.

Overview 
Lead vocalist Ronnie Van Zant and lead guitarist Steve Gaines died in a 1977 plane crash in Mississippi, and Lynyrd Skynyrd 1991 is the first album to feature their replacements, lead vocalist Johnny Van Zant (Ronnie's younger brother) and guitarist Randall Hall. It also marks the return of  original guitarist Ed King, who parted ways with the band while touring in support of Nuthin' Fancy in 1975. It was also the final Lynyrd Skynyrd album to feature drummer Artimus Pyle, who survived the crash. Guitarist and founding member Allen Collins also survived the 1977 plane crash but died in 1990 from chronic pneumonia.

"Smokestack Lightning" was released as a single with an accompanying music video and was met with moderate success.

Track listing

Personnel
Lynyrd Skynyrd
Johnny Van Zant - vocals
Gary Rossington - guitar
Ed King - guitar
Randall Hall - guitar
Leon Wilkeson - bass
Billy Powell - keyboard, piano
Artimus Pyle - drums and percussion
Kurt Custer - drums

Additional personnel
Dale Krantz-Rossington - backing vocals
Stephanie Bolton - backing vocals
Susan Marshall - backing vocals
Randall Hall - "Money Man"

Production personnel
Tom Dowd – producer
Kevin Elson – engineer, mixing, overdub engineer, overdubs
Carol Friedman – photography
John Hampton – engineer
Bob Ludwig – mastering
Jeff Powell – assistant, assistant engineer
Joe Reagoso – reissue producer, remastering
Randy Tuten – art direction, artwork, design

Chart positions

References

Lynyrd Skynyrd albums
1991 albums
Albums produced by Tom Dowd
Atlantic Records albums